Jan Marsalek (also Maršálek, born 15 March 1980 in Vienna) is an Austrian alleged white-collar criminal and former manager, known for his position as board member and chief operating officer of the German payment processing firm Wirecard. He has been a fugitive since June 2020 because of his role in the Wirecard scandal.

Biography
Marsalek went to school in Austria, but did not obtain a degree. Marsalek's grandfather, Hans Maršálek, was a member of the Austrian resistance and later a suspected spy for the Soviet Union. At the age of 19, he founded an e-commerce software company.

He started working for Wirecard in 2000 and was initially hired for his knowledge on WAP systems. On 1 February 2010, he became the firm's chief operating officer and also joined the company board.

His last known residence before he became a fugitive was in Munich.

Accusations

Marsalek is considered one of the main culprits in the Wirecard accounting scandal. The Financial Times reported that Marsalek is a person of interest for a number of European governments due to his alleged links to Russian intelligence. Investigation by Bellingcat, Der Spiegel, and The Insider indicated that Marsalek flew to Minsk hours after he was fired. On 19 July 2020, the German Handelsblatt reported that Marsalek was suspected to be in Russia, where he was believed to live under supervision of GRU in a mansion near Moscow. 

According to Russian media, Marsalek could have been a long-time asset of GRU, recruited at the end of the 1990s through the Austrian-Russian Friendship Society. Among his friends were GRU colonel Andrey Chuprygin, Stanislav Petlinskiy, former officer to the Presidential Administration in Russia, as well as Rami al-Obeidi, former chief of Libyan intelligence. Marsalek boasted about trips he made to Palmyra as a "guest of the Russian military" and helped set up the presence of Wagner Group in Libya.

In August 2020, Interpol issued a red notice for Marsalek, which is a request to law enforcement worldwide to locate and arrest him, pending extradition.

See also
List of fugitives from justice who disappeared

References

External links 
 Search for Jan Marsalek by the Federal Criminal Police Office (Germany)
 Jan Marsalek on Europe's Most Wanted Fugitives list from Europol

1980 births
Fugitives wanted by Germany
Fugitives wanted on fraud charges
Living people